Oberea walkeri is a species of beetle in the family Cerambycidae. It was described by Charles Joseph Gahan in 1894. It is known from Myanmar, Hong Kong, Laos, China, and Vietnam.

References

Beetles described in 1894
walkeri